Blethyn is a surname. Notable people with the surname include:

Bleddyn ap Cynfyn (died 1075), Welsh king
William Blethyn (died 1591), British bishop
Brenda Blethyn (born 1946), British actress
Geoff Blethyn (born 1950), Australian footballer